Senecio nevadensis is a species of flowering plant in the family Asteraceae.

References

External links

nevadensis
Flora of North Africa
Plants described in 1852
Taxa named by Pierre Edmond Boissier
Taxa named by George François Reuter